Marin Pilj (born 3 December 1996) is a Croatian professional footballer who plays as a midfielder for Varaždin.

References

External links
Marin Pilj at Soccerway

1996 births
Living people
Sportspeople from Osijek
Association football midfielders
Croatian footballers
NK Belišće players
NK Novigrad players
NK Osijek players
NK Olimpija Ljubljana (2005) players
NK Varaždin (2012) players
First Football League (Croatia) players
Croatian Football League players
Slovenian PrvaLiga players
Croatian expatriate footballers
Expatriate footballers in Slovenia
Croatian expatriate sportspeople in Slovenia